The Preacher (Swedish: Predikanten) is a 2004 psychological thriller by Camilla Läckberg, and translated into English by Steven T. Murray in 2009.

A young child who discovers a female cadaver in the Swedish countryside starts a cataclysmic chain of events: When the police arrive, two skeletons are discovered underneath the woman's body. It is believed they are the remains of two female teens, Siv Lantin and Mona Thernblad, who vanished in 1979. Clues point to the Hult family, comprising patriarch Gabriel, spouse Liane, and children Linda and Jacob, as well as Gabriel's estranged nephews Robert and Stefan and their mother, Solveig. When another young girl goes missing, Patrik Hedström, a detective, finds himself pitted against dead ends plus literary conundrums in a race to save her life. There is also Erica Falck's sister Anna, and her marriage problems, which form an internal theme. Läckberg acquaints us at the outset with what at first might seem an unlikely Swedish import: a pair who feed off holiday-makers from the metropolis, the head of a clan, now overweight yet acerbic. Patrik's task is hampered by a heat wave, Erika being with child (their first), and sycophantic relatives. Office machinations abound: a chief who likes getting all the kudos for cases just for himself; a resentful veteran cop who can't see that he's been kept back by his own slothfulness and ineptitude; and an otherwise dull colleague who defers to that veteran because of his higher rank. Patrik is smart and caring, but not always good. Faced with multiple sense impressions, he sometimes has trouble staying focused.

Plot
Almost every subplot focuses on a parent-child relationship: central we have three generations of misogynist father/son in which violations of young girls is almost enshrined; ramifications occur involving a parent/child relationship with a dysfunctional sliding scale.
The plot successfully exposes the pitfalls that can have deadly consequences when we take an end justifies the means approach.
Erica, the central character of The Ice Princess, becomes more of an adjunct, very much intimidated by her pregnancy, finding dealing with guests or unraveling the crime daunting. Instead it's down to Patrick and his trusty sidekick, Martin. As Patrick pursues ancient leads, his sixth sense tells him the Hults have something to do with these ugly murders. Their grandfather, known as The Preacher, moved into the community when one of his acolytes died, leaving both land and property for him to disperse. Soon it is found out that the Hults have more dark secrets than can be realized. Which of this family's skeletons will decide this is a perfect time to exit the closet?

In a review of the novel by The Washington Post, the reviewer noted that the "clever plot and in-depth characterization aren’t the only qualities that elevate “The Preacher” above most other thrillers. There’s also an admirable feel for detail."

References 

Swedish crime novels
Novels by Camilla Läckberg
Novels set in Sweden
2004 Swedish novels